Kinderman is a surname. Notable people with the surname include:

Keith Kinderman (1940–2018), American football player
Peter Kinderman (born 1965), British psychologist
William Kinderman (born 1952), American author and music scholar

See also
Jonathan Kindermans (born 1994), Belgian footballer
Kindermann